The elm cultivar Ulmus 'Pyramidalis Bertini' was listed by Lavallée without description in 1877 as Ulmus campestris var. pyramidalis Bertini. Considered "possibly Ulmus carpinifolia" (: U. minor) by Green.

Cultivation
No specimens are known to survive.

References

Ulmus articles missing images
Ulmus
Missing elm cultivars